The Melting Pot is a lost 1915 silent film drama based on the novel and 1909 Broadway play by Israel Zangwill. The film starred stage actor Walker Whiteside reprising his role from the Broadway play.

Cast
Walker Whiteside - David Quixano
Valentine Grant - Vera Ravendal
Flethcher Harvey - Baron Ravendal
Henry Bergman - Mendel Quixano
Julia Hurley - Frau Quixano
Doc Crane - Quincy Davenport (as Harold
Reginald Denny - unknown role (uncredited)
Wheeler Oakman - unknown role (uncredited)

References

External links
The Melting Pot at IMDb.com

1915 films
American silent feature films
Lost American films
American films based on plays
Films based on British novels
Films directed by James Vincent
1915 drama films
Silent American drama films
American black-and-white films
1910s American films